Patrie! is an 1886 French-language opera in five acts by Émile Paladilhe with a libretto by Victorien Sardou and Louis Gallet based on the play by Sardou about a 16th-century revolt of Flemish nobles in Brussels. The opera was Paladilhe's greatest popular success and was one of the last in the style of grand opera to premiere at the Paris Opéra.

Performance history
The opera was premiered on 16 December 1886 by the Opéra at the Palais Garnier in Paris. The mise-en-scène was by Pedro Gailhard, and the choreography, by Louis Merante. The opera was last performed at the Garnier on 9 August 1919, its 93rd performance.

The opera has also been performed outside of France, in Prague (28 April 1887, in Czech), Ghent (25 January 1888), Antwerp (6 March 1888), Rome (23 November 1889, in Italian), Hamburg (1 January 1890, in German), Amsterdam (1 September 1898, in Dutch), Geneva (19 February 1901), and Brussels (10 September 1931).

Roles

Recordings
"Pauvre martyr obscur", sung by the baritone Rysoor 
"Ah! Maintenant à moi!..., duet of Dolorès & Rysoor

References

External links
 
 Patrie! at The Opera Scribe

Operas
1886 operas
Operas by Émile Paladilhe
Opera world premieres at the Paris Opera
Operas set in Belgium
French-language operas
Operas based on plays
Operas based on works by Victorien Sardou